Jeremy Joe Kronsberg is an American film director, producer and screenwriter who appeared in such films as Every Which Way but Loose, Any Which Way You Can and Going Ape!.

Jeremy is the father of actor Gabriel Jarret.

Filmography
Every Which Way but Loose (1978) – Bruno (Black Widow)

References

External links

Jeremy Joe Kronsberg Stock Photos and Pictures, Getty Images

American male screenwriters
American film producers
American film directors
Living people
Year of birth missing (living people)